Otto Fritz Meyerhof (12 April 1884 – 6 October 1951) was a German physician and biochemist who won the 1922 Nobel Prize in Physiology and Medicine.

Biography
Otto Fritz Meyerhof was born in Hannover, at Theaterplatz 16A (now:Rathenaustrasse 16A), the son of wealthy Jewish parents. In 1888, his family moved to Berlin, where Otto spent most of his childhood, and where he started his study of medicine. He continued these studies in Strasbourg and Heidelberg, from which he graduated in 1909, with a work titled "Contributions to the Psychological Theory of Mental Illness". In Heidelberg, he met Hedwig Schallenberg. They married in 1914
and became parents of a daughter, Bettina, and two sons, Gottfried (who referred, after emigration, to himself as Geoffrey) as well as Walter.

In 1912, Otto Meyerhof moved to the University of Kiel, where he received a professorship in 1918. In 1922, he was awarded the Nobel Prize in Medicine, with Archibald Vivian Hill, for his work on muscle metabolism, including glycolysis. In 1929, he became one of the directors of the Kaiser Wilhelm Institute for Medical Research, a position he held until 1938.  Escaping the Nazi regime, he emigrated to Paris in 1938. He then moved to the United States in 1940, where he was appointed a guest professorship at the University of Pennsylvania in Philadelphia. In recognition of his contributions to the study of glycolysis, the common series of reactions for the pathway in Eukaryotes is known as the Embden–Meyerhof–Parnas Pathway.

Meyerhof died in Philadelphia at the age of 67.

See also
 List of Jewish Nobel laureates

References

External links
 Meyerhof Curriculum Vitae and Obituary
National Academy of Sciences Biographical Memoir
  the Nobel Lecture on 12 December 1923 Energy Conversions in Muscle

1884 births
1951 deaths
Nobel laureates in Physiology or Medicine
German Nobel laureates
German biochemists
Jewish American scientists
Jewish chemists
Jewish physicians
American people of German-Jewish descent
Physicians from Hanover
People from the Province of Hanover
Scientists from Berlin
People from the Province of Brandenburg
Heidelberg University alumni
University of Pennsylvania faculty
Academic staff of the University of Kiel
University of Strasbourg alumni
Foreign Members of the Royal Society
Jewish emigrants from Nazi Germany to the United States
Members of the United States National Academy of Sciences
20th-century  German physicians
Max Planck Institute directors